Team Canada Mission in Canadian politics is a public-relations mission led by the Prime Minister of Canada, the Minister of International Trade along with the leaders of the provinces and territories of Canada.

The purpose of the Mission is to promote Canadian business development in order to increase trade and investment.

The first Team Canada Mission was made in 1994 led by PM Jean Chrétien.

The Canadian Trade Commissioner Service lists the following as having been "Team Canada" mission (led by the Prime Minister):

January 2002
Russia and Germany (Moscow, Berlin, Munich)
Focus Sector(s): Multi-sector

November 2001
Team Canada West (Dallas, Los Angeles)
Focus Sector(s): Multi-sector

May 2001
Team Canada Atlantic (Atlanta)
Focus Sector(s): Multi-sector

February 2001
China (Beijing, Shanghai, Hong Kong)
Focus Sector(s): Multi-sector

May 2000
Team Canada Atlantic (Boston)
Focus Sector(s): Multi-sector

September 1999
Japan (Tokyo, Osaka)
Focus Sector(s): Multi-sector

January 1998
Mexico, Brazil, Argentina, Chile (Mexico City, São Paulo, Buenos Aires, Santiago)
Focus Sector(s): Multi-sector

References

External links
 Canada Trade Missions - Team Canada Missions

Foreign relations of Canada
Types of diplomacy
Foreign trade of Canada
Diplomatic conferences